Pseudoalteromonas aliena is a marine, aerobic, heterotrophic  bacterium that has been collected from Amur Bay.

References

External links

Type strain of Pseudoalteromonas aliena at BacDive -  the Bacterial Diversity Metadatabase

Alteromonadales
Bacteria described in 2004